The 1900–01 MIT Engineers men's ice hockey season was the 3rd season of play for the program.

Season
MIT scheduled several games for the season, however, many were postponed or cancelled. Some of the university's records about this season are missing as the school yearbook skips from the 1900 season to the 1902 season. The record of only one game appears in the University newspaper and while it does mention a few others, there's no evidence that any more games were played.

The team did not have a head coach but Roger Burr served as team manager and president.

Note: Massachusetts Institute of Technology athletics were referred to as 'Engineers' or 'Techmen' during the first two decades of the 20th century. By 1920 all sports programs had adopted the Engineer moniker.

Roster

Standings

Schedule and Results

|-
!colspan=12 style=";" | Regular Season

References

MIT Engineers men's ice hockey seasons
MIT
MIT
MIT
MIT
MIT